Ghana Grid Company is an electricity transmission company in Ghana. GRIDCo was incorporated on December 15, 2006 as a private limited liability company and started operations in 2008 following the transfer of the core staff and power transmission assets from Volta River Authority  with a mandate to ensure the provision of transparent, non-discriminatory and open access to the transmission grid for all the participants in the power market particularly, power generators and bulk consumers and thus bring about efficiency in power deliver.

See also

 Electricity sector in Ghana

References

Electric power companies of Ghana
Ghanaian companies established in 2008